Jonathan Moss may refer to:

 Jonathan Moss (cricketer) (born 1975), Australian first-class cricketer
 Jonathan Moss, a character in the Southern Victory series by Harry Turtledove
 Jonathan Moss (referee) (born 1970), English football referee
 Jonathan Moss (rower), American lightweight rower
 Jon Moss (born 1957), drummer

See also
 John Moss (disambiguation)